Bonner Ahmed Mosquera (born 2 December 1970) is a Colombian former football player, who used to play in the defender or midfielder position.

Club career
He is the player with the most appearances ever in Millonarios, 524 in total, surpassing players like Willington Ortiz in number of appearances made as a Millos player.

Retirement
Mosquera retired from professional football in December 2006, although he continued his commitment to Millonarios, where he eventually became Assistant Manager.

External links
 

1970 births
Living people
Colombian footballers
Colombia international footballers
Colombian expatriate footballers
Categoría Primera A players
Uruguayan Primera División players
Millonarios F.C. players
Defensor Sporting players
Expatriate footballers in Uruguay
Colombian football managers
1995 Copa América players
2000 CONCACAF Gold Cup players
Association football defenders
Association football midfielders
Sportspeople from Chocó Department